Friends of the People is an American sketch comedy television series. It was slated to premiere on TruTV in summer 2014, but was pushed to October 28, 2014, as part of the network's shift in their programming direction. Many of the cast members (Jennifer Bartels, Jermaine Fowler, and Lil Rel Howery) were originally reported to be cast members of a planned revival of In Living Color which never materialized. The show's first season consisted of 10 episodes. This made it the network's first sketch comedy show. The series held a TV-14 rating, though select episodes were rated TV-MA — also a first for the truTV network.

Cast
Kevin Barnett
Jennifer Bartels
Jermaine Fowler
Lil Rel Howery
Keith Lucas
Kenny Lucas
Josh Rabinowitz

References

External links

2010s American sketch comedy television series
2014 American television series debuts
2015 American television series endings
English-language television shows
TruTV original programming
Television series by 3 Arts Entertainment